The  was an agreement between the United States and Japan in which the United States relinquished in favor of Japan all rights and interests under Article III of the Treaty of San Francisco, which had been obtained as a result of the Pacific War, and thus return the Okinawa Prefecture to Japanese sovereignty. The document was signed simultaneously in Washington, DC, and Tokyo on June 17, 1971, by William P. Rogers on behalf of United States President Richard Nixon and Kiichi Aichi on behalf of Japanese Prime Minister Eisaku Satō. The document was not ratified in Japan until November 24, 1971, by the National Diet.

Terms 
The agreement is divided into nine major articles that specify the details of this agreement. America returned control of the Ryukyu Islands and the Daitō Islands (also known as the Okinawa Prefecture) to Japan, if the United States Armed Forces could occupy Okinawa as well have access to its facilities. The Americans maintained a large military presence in Okinawa because its strategic location and intense fighting made it known as the "Keystone of the Pacific" during World War II.

Under the agreement, the Ryukyu and the Daitō Islands would become subject to all existing and future treaties agreed upon between the Americans and the Japanese. The United States would help to repair damages done to land seized by American administrations. The treaty also states that Japan would recognize actions taken by the United States administration in those areas, and that the administration would not be held liable for criminal activity during its time. The Japanese government also agreed to pay the United States government $320,000,000 over the next five years.

The goals of the agreement for the United States were to transfer sovereignty, ensure that the United States could help a democratic government, and ensure that Japan would not be able to endanger the peace.

Negotiations 

The reversion of Okinawa back to Japan was met with several complications between American and Japanese diplomats. Many diplomats met with each other and wanted to solve the issues between the two countries, but complications and conflicting interests made reversion problematic.

Early negotiations 

Negotiations began between United States Ambassador to Japan U. Alexis Johnson and Japanese Foreign Minister Kiichi Aichi in 1968. The two worked well together and established an effective working relationship in the hope of quickly coming to an understanding. The discussions moved slowly at first because Japan's primary concern was for a confirmed date of reversion, before agreeing upon the specifics of the agreement, which came to be known as the "clean-slate" policy. Aichi's active role in foreign policy helped make a breakthrough in negotiations when he suggested Reversion by 1972, suggesting to Johnson that military bases could maintain all present freedoms until both governments agreed upon a gradual removal without any threat to regional security. In a following negotiation with Henry Kissinger, Kissinger stated that the military presence in Okinawa served as a deterrent to nuclear weapon development.

Morton Halperin outlined the American stance on the reversion. Firstly, removal of American nuclear weapons from Okinawa. If North Korea were determined to invade South Korea, the Americans' willingness to fire nuclear weapons to defend the South could deter the North from invading at all. The United States was also concerned that reversion of Okinawa would be interpreted by others as retreating from Asia. The United States considered Okinawa part of Japan and intended to revert sovereignty by 1972 but only if its concerns were completely dealt with by then.

US-Japan Kyoto Conference 
At the US-Japan Kyoto Conference, Japan argued that keeping nuclear weapons in Okinawa would be redundant and that there were more suitable areas for military presence. Support from American specialists helped to persuade Americans the benefits of reversion. After the conference, a summary stated that the United States had an official concern that Japan would support military resources with no forces to the United States if there were a crisis in the Korean Peninsula.

Talks between Nixon and Kishi 
Special Envoy Kishi met President Nixon with two preconceived desires. Japan sought reversion by 1972 with, at least, denuclearized US military bases.  On April 1, 1969, Kishi told President Nixon that "many Japanese feel that if Japan is to play a greater role in Asia, it is quite unacceptable for part of their country to remain occupied by a foreign power." Kishi also believed that maintaining the status quo in Okinawa could risk political fallout. Nixon assured him that he was well informed about the topic and that relations between United States and Japan were important to him.

Final stages 
The United States had informed Japan that reversion was possible if in the event of an emergency, nuclear weapons were allowed in Okinawa. The issue was brought forth by the United States as an ultimatum.  Japan complied, but the ultimatum brought up complications on what was considered an emergency that warranted nuclear weapons. Although Japan did not believe such an emergency would ever occur, its goal for total denuclearization had failed. The United States also sought for fair competition with Japanese wool textile manufacturers. Because economy and government are intertwined, America pressed for regulations on wool manufacturers. Since the issue of reversion became tied to trade, top-secret discussions took place at the White House and ended with an agreement to meet with other countries concerning the General Agreement on Tariffs and Trade in which Japan promised to support the Americans' search for fair trade.

China criticized the reversion of sovereignty because of its claims on the area, based on ancient Chinese maritime logs, . Its references were judged insufficiently credible to validate their claim.  The historical circumstances remain a subject of debate.

Reaction in Japan 
The agreements sparked controversy in both Okinawa and mainland Japan for different reasons. Despite the desire of many inhabitants of the islands for independence, the Japanese government decided to negotiate the reversion of the prefecture back to its control. The document was not ratified in Japan until November 24, 1971, by the National Diet. Even before the discussions, the Ryukyu independence movement aimed to have Okinawa independent from both America and Japan. In Tokyo, a group of radical students discontent with American military presence in Okinawa, rioted using Molotov cocktails and steel pipes, killing a police officer. The Koza riot was another example of the social unrest that took place in Japan during that time. American military forces reported that the reversion of sovereignty created a new and challenging environment for military forces to deal with.

Okinawa Reversion 40th Anniversary Ceremony 
In 2011, Prime Minister Yoshihiko Noda visited Okinawa and gave a speech stating the Japanese government supports Okinawa's independent plans to help improve the prefecture. He also acknowledged the burden that the military bases in Okinawa have on the islanders and claimed to continue trying to reduce the burden. Noda also said, "It is Okinawa that will be the driving force for Japan as a whole, creating a role for itself at the forefront of the Asia-Pacific era. It is we who are responsible for creating this future. There is no doubt that the aspirations of the people of Okinawa for peace, and their globally-minded spirit as a "bridge between nations" will be a tremendous asset in the development and growth of Okinawa in the 21st century."

Citizens in Okinawa continue to seek the removal of military bases and equal living standards with mainland Japanese citizens. Since the reversion, the inhabitants of Okinawa rely on government investment for improvement, instead of American military spending.

References

External links
 Text of the Agreement at the Ryukyu-Okinawa History and Culture Website

Japan–United States treaties
1971 in Japan
Okinawa Islands